Bear Hollow is a valley in McDonald County in  the U.S. state of Missouri.

Some say Bear Hollow derives its name from a corruption of Baer, the surname of a local family, while others believe the area was a hunting ground of bears, causing the name to be selected.

References

Valleys of McDonald County, Missouri
Valleys of Missouri